To compete in the Professional Darts Corporation pro tour tournaments one needs a Tour Card.

In total 128 players are granted Tour Cards, which enables them to participate in all Players Championships, UK Open Qualifiers and European Tour events.

A Tour Card is valid for 2 years. The top 64 in the PDC Order of Merit all received Tour Cards automatically, and those who won a two-year card in 2017 still had a valid card for 2018. The top 2 of the 2017 Challenge Tour and Development Tour also won cards. 33 remaining places were played out at the 2018 Q-Schools, with the four days of competition giving two Cards a day from the UK Q-School and one a day from the European Q-School; with the remaining players being ranked and the top players also receiving Cards. All players who won a card at either Q-School had their Order of Merit ranking reset to zero.

Players

See also
List of darts players
List of darts players who have switched organisation

References 

2018 PDC Pro Tour
2018 in darts
Lists of darts players